Jelisaveta "Seka" Sablić (born 13 June 1942) is a Serbian actress. She had performed in theatre houses in Belgrade and on TV and film. She is the winner of major theatre awards in Serbia and former Yugoslavia.

Personal life
She grew up in Belgrade. Her father Stevan was from Mala Gradusa in Banija; her mother was born in Dorćol, of Sephardic Jewish descent.

Her son Stefan Sablić is a theatre director.

Filmography

Television

Film

Awards
Montréal World Film Festival, Best Actress, 1982, for Maratonci trče počasni krug
Pula Film Festival, Best Actress, 1982, for Maratonci trče počasni krug
Days of Nušić Festival, Award for lifework of a Comedian, 2006
Ljubinka Bobić Award, 2006
Golden Turkey, Best Actress, 2006, for Svinjski otac
Žanka Stokić Award, Best Actress, 2008

References

External links 
 

20th-century Serbian actresses
Living people
1942 births
Actresses from Belgrade
21st-century Serbian actresses
Serbian film actresses
Serbian stage actresses
Serbian television actresses
Serbian voice actresses
Golden Arena winners
Serbian Sephardi Jews
Ljubinka Bobić Award winners
Miloš Žutić Award winners
Laureates of the Ring of Dobrica
Žanka Stokić award winners